Bindeshwar Pathak is an Indian sociologist and social entrepreneur. He is the founder of Sulabh International, an India-based social service organisation which works to promote human rights, environmental sanitation, non-conventional sources of energy, waste management and social reforms through education. He is the Brand Ambassador for Swachh Rail Mission of Indian Railways. His work is considered pioneering in social reform, especially in the field of sanitation and hygiene. He received various national and international awards for his work with this organisation. He was presented with the Lal Bahadur Shastri National Award for Excellence in Public Administration, Academics and Management for the year 2017. He was conferred with Padma Bhushan, India's third-highest civilian award in 1991.

Education
Bindeshwar Pathak graduated in Sociology in 1964 from the Banaras Hindu University. He earned his master's degree in 1980 and his PhD in 1985, from the University of Patna. A prolific writer and speaker, Dr. Pathak has authored several books, the most well-known of which is The Road to Freedom, and is a frequent participant in conferences on sanitation, health and social progress around the world.

Movement for Sanitation and Hygiene
He first came to understand the plight of scavengers in 1968 when he joined the Bhangi-Mukti (scavengers’ liberation) Cell of the Bihar Gandhi Centenary Celebrations Committee. During that time, he travelled throughout India, living with scavenger families as part of his Ph.D. research. Drawing on that experience, he resolved to take action, not only out of sympathy for the scavengers but also in the belief that scavenging is a dehumanising practice that would ultimately have a destructive impact on modern Indian society. He was an MP of Bhagalpur in Indian National Congress.

He established the Sulabh International Social Service Organization in 1970, combining technical innovation with humanitarian principles. The organisation works to promote human rights, environmental sanitation, non-conventional sources of energy, waste management and social reforms through education. The organisation counts 50,000 volunteers. He has made innovative use of biogas creation by linking Sulabh toilets to fermentation plants, he had designed over three decades ago and which are now becoming a byword for sanitation in developing countries all over the world. One of the distinctive feature of Pathak's project lies in the fact that besides producing odour-free bio-gas, it also releases clean water rich in phosphorus and other ingredients which are important constituents of organic manure. His sanitation movement ensures cleanliness and prevents greenhouse gas emission.

Recognition

Bindeshwar Pathak is a Padma Bhushan recipient from the Government of India. In 2003, his name was added to the Global 500 Roll of Honour. Bindheshwar Pathak also received the Energy Globe Award, and the Dubai International Award for Best Practices. Stockholm Water Prize was awarded to him in year 2009. In June 2013, he also received the Legend of Planet award from the French senate in Paris, ahead of World Environment Day. Antarrashtriya Bhojpuri Samman was awarded to him in the 4th world Bhojpuri Sammelan in Port Louis.

In January 2011, Pathak was invited to deliver a lecture at The Cambridge Union, a debating society of the University of Cambridge in England. The lecture was well received by the students where Dr Pathak urged the students to join voluntary work in the field of sanitation.

In 2014, he was honoured by Sardar Patel International Award for "Excellence in the field of Social Development".

In April 2016, Bill De Blasio, Mayor of New York City, declared 14 April 2016 as Bindeshwar Pathak Day.

On 12 July 2017, Pathak's book The Making of a Legend, on the life of Prime Minister Narendra Modi was launched in New Delhi.

In 2020, 'Namaste, Bindeshwar Pathak!' an inspiring book detailing his work as a social innovator was published.

He was named Indian Affairs Social Reformer Of The Year, 2017, at the 8th Annual India Leadership Conclave. In June 2018 he was honoured with the Nikkei Asia prize for culture and community by Nikkei inc in Tokyo, Japan.

References

External links

Profile of a national crusader
 Bindeshwar Pathak wins international award
French Senate honours Sulabh founder with 'Legend of Planet' award

1943 births
Indian sociologists
Living people
Scientists from Patna
Social workers from Bihar
Patna University alumni
Recipients of the Padma Bhushan in social work
20th-century Indian educational theorists
Social workers
21st-century Indian educational theorists
Winners of the Nikkei Asia Prize